Russian Army may refer to:
 Russian Armed Forces
 Russian Ground Forces
 Imperial Russian Army, the army of the Russian Empire
 Russian Army (1917), Russian army in the interim period between the fall of the Russian Empire and the Bolshevik revolution
 Russian Army (1919), White Army during the Russian Civil War under command of Admiral Kolchak.
 Russian Army (1920), White Army during the Russian Civil War under command of Pyotr Wrangel.
 Red Army, the army of the Soviet Russia and Soviet Union
 Russian Liberation Army

See also 

 Russian Army Choir
 Russian Caucasus Army (disambiguation)
 Miss Russian Army
 List of Imperial Russian Army formations and units 1914